Matthew 'Mat' Ryan (1913–1994) was an Australian rugby league player who played in the 1930s.

Ryan followed his brother Bill Ryan to St. George from the local Leeton rugby league club. Both brothers hailed from Junee, New South Wales.  Ryan played one season for the Saints before leaving Sydney.

Ryan died on 29 October 1994 at Toormina, New South Wales.

References

1913 births
1994 deaths
St. George Dragons players
Australian rugby league players
Rugby league centres
Rugby league players from Albury, New South Wales